Shahrak-e Vahdat (also Romanized as Shahrak-e Vaḩdat; also known as Shahrak-e Vaḩdat-e Bīsheh Derāz) is a village in Anaran Rural District, in the Central District of Dehloran County, Ilam Province, Iran. At the 2006 census, its population was 716, in 148 families. The village is populated by Lurs.

References 

Populated places in Dehloran County
Luri settlements in Ilam Province